As a surname, Piqué may refer to:

 Gerard Piqué (born 1987), Spanish footballer
 Josep Piqué (born 1955), Spanish politician and businessman
 Lorenzo Piqué (born 1990), Dutch footballer
 Marco Piqué (born 1980), Dutch-Surinamese kickboxer
 Mitchell Piqué (born 1979), Dutch footballer

See also
 Piquer (surname)
 Piquet

Catalan-language surnames